

Administrative and municipal divisions

 ✪ - part of Ust-Orda Buryat Okrug (Усть-Орды́нский Буря́тский о́круг)

References

See also
Administrative divisions of Ust-Orda Buryat Autonomous Okrug

Irkutsk Oblast
Irkutsk Oblast